The heads of humans and other animals are frequently occurring charges in heraldry.  The blazon, or heraldic description, usually states whether an animal's head is couped (as if cut off cleanly at the neck), erased (as if forcibly ripped from the body), or cabossed (turned affronté without any of the neck showing).  Human heads are often described in much greater detail, though some of these are identified by name with little or no further description.

Heads of humans
Heads of humans are sometimes blazoned simply as a "man's head", but are far more frequently described in greater detail, either characteristic of a particular race or nationality (such as Moors' heads, Saxons' heads, Egyptians' heads or Turks' heads), or specifically identified (such as the head of Moses in the crest of Hilton, or the head of St. John the Baptist in the crest of the Worshipful Company of Tallow Chandlers).  Several varieties of women's heads also occur, including maidens' heads (often couped under the bust, with hair disheveled), ladies' heads, nuns' heads (often veiled), and occasionally queens' heads.  The arms of Daveney of Norfolk include "three nun's heads veiled couped at the shoulders proper," and the bust of a queen occurs in the arms of Queenborough, Kent.  Infants' or children's heads are often couped at the shoulders with a snake wrapped around the neck (e.g. "Argent, a boy's head proper, crined or, couped below the shoulders, vested gules, garnished gold," in the arms of Boyman).

Heads of animals

While lions passant guardant (i.e. walking with head turned to full face) are often called leopards in heraldry, the heads and faces of natural leopards occur frequently in armory, as crests as well as charges.  The key distinction being that a leopard's head shows the neck, the leopard's face (turned affronté and cut off cleanly behind the ears) occurs far more frequently.  A curious development, unique to the leopard's face, is when it is run through with a fleur-de-lis, called a leopard's face Jessant-de-lys.  When the face of a fox is shown (i.e. cabossed), it is termed a fox's mask.

Predatory creatures, including eagles, lions, griffins, bears and boars, are often armed of a different tincture, referring to the colour of the creature's claws or talons and beak, teeth or tusks. In the case of the boar, its armaments include only its tusks, but not its hooves, which may be unguled of another tincture.  Deer and moose are antler-bearing herbivores, so their antlers are not considered armaments but their attire, so these may be attired of a distinct tincture, while horn-bearing beasts such as bulls, rams and goats may be armed.

Gallery

See also
Moor's head (heraldry)
Turk head (heraldry)
Skull and crossbones (symbol)
Totenkopf
Cabossed
Erasure (heraldry)
Jessant-de-lys

References

External links

Heraldic charges